Hondryches is a genus of moths of the family Noctuidae.

Species
Hondryches ambrensis (Viette, 1972)
Hondryches avakubi (Holland, 1920)
Hondryches efulensis (Holland, 1920)
Hondryches gueneei (Viette, 1966)
Hondryches incertana Viette, 1958)
Hondryches odontographa (Gaede, 1939)
Hondryches phalaeniformis (Guenee, 1852)
Hondryches problematica (Viette, 1958)
Hondryches tessemanni Gaede, 1939

References

Calpinae